The Sordo is a small river in eastern Umbria in Italy.

Rivers of Umbria
Rivers of Italy